Narciso Ibáñez Serrador (also known as Chicho Ibáñez Serrador or Luis Peñafiel; 4 July 1935 – 7 June 2019) was a Spanish film, television and theater director, actor and screenwriter.

Biography
Serrador was born in 1935 in Montevideo and from an early age was influenced by the world of acting: his father was the Spanish theater director Narciso Ibáñez Menta, while his mother was Argentinian actress Pepita Serrador. He spent his childhood in Latin America accompanying his parents during their tour performances. 

In 1947 he moved to Spain, where he attended high school in the city of Salamanca.  He began to work with a theater company and made his theater director debut with The Glass Menagerie by Tennessee Williams. 

In 1963 he began to work in Spanish television and later transitioned to feature films and directed such films as The House That Screamed and Who Can Kill a Child? The two works that gave him fame in Spain were on television, they were the game show Un, dos, tres... responda otra vez and the horror series Historias para no dormir.

In 2001, Ibáñez Serrador received the Gold Medal of Merit in the Fine Arts by the Ministry of Education, Culture and Sports.

He died on 7 June 2019 from a urinary tract infection at the age of 83.

References

Sources
 Michael Orlando Yaccarino, La Residencia: An Analysis, in Filmfax (1999)

External links

Spanish film directors
Spanish film producers
Spanish male screenwriters
Horror film directors
Spanish people of Uruguayan descent
Spanish people of Asturian descent
Spanish people of Argentine descent
Uruguayan people of Spanish descent
Uruguayan people of Asturian descent
Uruguayan people of Argentine descent
People from Montevideo
Uruguayan expatriates in Spain
Infectious disease deaths in Spain
Deaths from urinary tract infection
1935 births
2019 deaths